NGB can refer to:

 National Geographic Bee, an annual geography contest in the United States
 National governing body, a sport governing body for a nation
 National Guard Bureau, the federal instrument responsible for the administration of the United States National Guard
 Nederlandse Gidsen Beweging (Dutch Guide Movement), one of the Scouting organisations that evolved into the national Scouting organisation of the Netherlands
 Neuroglobin protein
 Next-Generation Bomber, a medium bomber formally under development by the United States Air Force
 Ngb, a trigraph in some African orthographies
 Ningbo Lishe International Airport, IATA airport code
 Nordic Gene Bank, the former name of NordGen – Nordic Genetic Resource Center
 Northern Ngbandi language, ISO 639-3 code
 Novagalicia Banco, a Spanish bank
 Von Neumann–Bernays–Gödel set theory, abbreviated NBG or NGB